The Gentianales are an order of flowering plants, included within the asterid clade of eudicots. It comprises more than 16,000 species in about 1,138 genera in 5 families. More than 80% of the species in this order belong to the family Rubiaceae.

The anthophytes are a grouping of plant taxa bearing flower-like reproductive structures. They were formerly thought to be a clade comprising plants bearing flower-like structures.  The group contained the angiosperms - the extant flowering plants, such as roses and grasses - as well as the Gnetales and the extinct Bennettitales.

23,420 species of vascular plant have been recorded in South Africa, making it the sixth most species-rich country in the world and the most species-rich country on the African continent. Of these, 153 species are considered to be threatened. Nine biomes have been described in South Africa: Fynbos, Succulent Karoo, desert, Nama Karoo, grassland, savanna, Albany thickets, the Indian Ocean coastal belt, and forests.

The 2018 South African National Biodiversity Institute's National Biodiversity Assessment plant checklist lists 35,130 taxa in the phyla Anthocerotophyta (hornworts (6)), Anthophyta (flowering plants (33534)), Bryophyta (mosses (685)), Cycadophyta (cycads (42)), Lycopodiophyta (Lycophytes(45)), Marchantiophyta (liverworts (376)), Pinophyta (conifers (33)), and Pteridophyta (cryptogams (408)).

Five families are represented in the literature. Listed taxa include species, subspecies, varieties, and forms as recorded, some of which have subsequently been allocated to other taxa as synonyms, in which cases the accepted taxon is appended to the listing. Multiple entries under alternative names reflect taxonomic revision over time.

Apocynaceae

Family: Apocynaceae, 112 genera have been recorded. Not all are necessarily currently accepted.

Genus Acokanthera:
Genus Adenium:
Genus Ancylobothrys:
Genus Anisotoma:
Genus Araujia:
Genus Arduina:
Genus Asclepias:
Genus Aspidoglossum:
Genus Astephanus:
Genus Australluma:
Genus Brachystelma:
Genus Callichilia:
Genus Calotropis:
Genus Caralluma:
Genus Carandas:
Genus Carissa:
Genus Cascabela:
Genus Catharanthus:
Genus Ceropegia:
Genus Chlorocyathus:
Genus Cordylogyne:
Genus Cryptolepis:
Genus Cryptostegia:
Genus Curroria:
Genus Cynanchum:
Genus Daemia:
Genus Dichaelia:
Genus Diplorhynchus:
Genus Dregea:
Genus Duvalia:
Genus Echites:
Genus Ectadiopsis:
Genus Ectadium:
Genus Emplectanthus:
Genus Ephippiocarpa:
Genus Eustegia:
Genus Fanninia:
Genus Fockea:
Genus Funastrum: (syn. Sarcostemma)
Genus Gomphocarpus:
Genus Gonioma:
Genus Gymnema:
Genus Holarrhena:
Genus Hoodia:
Genus Huernia:
Genus Huerniopsis:
Genus Ischnolepis:
Genus Jasminonerium:
Genus Kanahia:
Genus Lagarinthus:
Genus Landolphia:
Genus Larryleachia:
Genus Lavrania:
Genus Luckhoffia:
Genus Macropetalum:
Genus Marsdenia:
Genus Microloma:
Genus Miraglossum:
Genus Mondia:
Genus Nerium:
Genus Notechidnopsis:
Genus Oncinema:
Genus Oncinotis:
Genus Ophionella:
Genus Orbea:
Genus Orbeanthus:
Genus Orbeopsis:
Genus Orthanthera:
Genus Pachycarpus:
Genus Pachycymbium:
Genus Pachypodium:
Genus Parapodium:
Genus Pectinaria:
Genus Pentarrhinum:
Genus Pentopetia:
Genus Pergularia:
Genus Periglossum:
Genus Petopentia:
Genus Piaranthus:
Genus Quaqua:
Genus Raphionacme:
Genus Rauvolfia:
Genus Rhyssolobium:
Genus Richtersveldia:
Genus Riocreuxia:
Genus Schizoglossum:
Genus Schizostephanus:
Genus Secamone:
Genus Sisyranthus:
Genus Sphaerocodon:
Genus Stapelia:
Genus Stapeliopsis:
Genus Stenostelma:
Genus Stomatostemma:
Genus Strophanthus:
Genus Tabernaemontana:
Genus Tacazzea:
Genus Tavaresia:
Genus Telosma:
Genus Tenaris:
Genus Thevetia:
Genus Trachycalymma:
Genus Trichocaulon:
Genus Tridentea:
Genus Tromotriche:
Genus Vinca:
Genus Vincetoxicum (syn. Tylophora)
Genus Voacanga:
Genus Woodia:
Genus Wrightia:
Genus Xysmalobium:

Asclepiadaceae
 Family: Asclepiadaceae,

Belonites
Genus Belonites:
 Belonites succulentus (L.f.) E.Mey. accepted as Pachypodium succulentum (L.f.) Sweet, indigenous

Neopectinaria
Genus Neopectinaria:
 Neopectinaria saxatilis (N.E.Br.) Plowes, accepted as Stapeliopsis saxatilis (N.E.Br.) Bruyns, indigenous
 Neopectinaria saxatilis (N.E.Br.) Plowes var. tulipiflora (C.A.Luckh.) Plowes, accepted as Stapeliopsis saxatilis (N.E.Br.) Bruyns, indigenous
 Neopectinaria stayneri (M.B.Bayer) Plowes, accepted as Stapeliopsis stayneri (M.B.Bayer) Bruyns, indigenous

Gentianaceae
 Family: Gentianaceae,

Anthocleista
Genus Anthocleista:
 Anthocleista grandiflora Gilg, indigenous

Chironia
Genus Chironia:
 Chironia albiflora Hilliard, endemic
 Chironia arenaria E.Mey. endemic
 Chironia baccifera L. endemic
 Chironia decumbens Levyns, endemic
 Chironia jasminoides L. endemic
 Chironia krebsii Griseb. indigenous
 Chironia laxa Gilg, endemic
 Chironia linoides L. indigenous
 Chironia linoides L. subsp. emarginata (Jaroscz) I.Verd. endemic
 Chironia linoides L. subsp. linoides,   endemic
 Chironia linoides L. subsp. macrocalyx (Prain) I.Verd. endemic
 Chironia linoides L. subsp. nana I.Verd. endemic
 Chironia melampyrifolia Lam. endemic
 Chironia palustris Burch. indigenous
 Chironia palustris Burch. subsp. palustris,   indigenous
 Chironia palustris Burch. subsp. rosacea (Gilg) I.Verd. indigenous
 Chironia palustris Burch. subsp. transvaalensis (Gilg) I.Verd. indigenous
 Chironia peduncularis Lindl. endemic
 Chironia peglerae Prain, endemic
 Chironia purpurascens (E.Mey.) Benth. & Hook.f. indigenous
 Chironia purpurascens (E.Mey.) Benth. & Hook.f. subsp. humilis (Gilg) I.Verd. indigenous
 Chironia purpurascens (E.Mey.) Benth. & Hook.f. subsp. purpurascens,   indigenous
 Chironia serpyllifolia Lehm. endemic
 Chironia stokoei I.Verd. endemic
 Chironia tetragona L.f. endemic

Enicostema
Genus Enicostema:
 Enicostema axillare (Lam.) A.Raynal, indigenous
 Enicostema axillare (Lam.) A.Raynal subsp. axillare,   indigenous
 Enicostema hyssopifolium (Willd.) I.Verd. accepted as Enicostema axillare (Lam.) A.Raynal subsp. axillare,   present

Exacum
Genus Exacum:
 Exacum oldenlandioides (S.Moore) Klack. indigenous

Lagenias
Genus Lagenias:
 Lagenias pusillus (Eckl. ex Cham.) E.Mey. endemic

Neurotheca
Genus Neurotheca:
 Neurotheca congolana De Wild. & T.Durand, indigenous
 Neurotheca schlechteri Gilg ex Baker, accepted as Neurotheca congolana De Wild. & T.Durand, present

Orphium
Genus Orphium:
 Orphium frutescens (L.) E.Mey. endemic

Sebaea
Genus Sebaea:
 Sebaea albens (L.f.) Roem. & Schult. endemic
 Sebaea ambigua Cham. endemic
 Sebaea amicorum I.M.Oliv. & Beyers, endemic
 Sebaea aurea (L.f.) Roem. & Schult. endemic
 Sebaea bojeri Griseb. indigenous
 Sebaea capitata Cham. & Schltdl. indigenous
 Sebaea capitata Cham. & Schltdl. var. capitata,   endemic
 Sebaea capitata Cham. & Schltdl. var. sclerosepala (Schinz) Marais, endemic
 Sebaea compacta A.W.Hill, endemic
 Sebaea debilis (Welw.) Schinz, accepted as Exochaenium debile Welw. 
 Sebaea elongata E.Mey. endemic
 Sebaea erosa Schinz, indigenous
 Sebaea exacoides (L.) Schinz, endemic
 Sebaea exigua (Oliv.) Schinz, indigenous
 Sebaea filiformis Schinz, indigenous
 Sebaea fourcadei Marais, endemic
 Sebaea grandis (E.Mey.) Steud. accepted as Exochaenium grande (E.Mey.) Griseb. indigenous
 Sebaea grisebachiana Schinz, endemic
 Sebaea hymenosepala Gilg, endemic
 Sebaea junodii Schinz, indigenous
 Sebaea laxa N.E.Br. endemic
 Sebaea leiostyla Gilg, indigenous
 Sebaea longicaulis Schinz, indigenous
 Sebaea macrophylla Gilg, indigenous
 Sebaea marlothii Gilg, indigenous
 Sebaea membranacea A.W.Hill, endemic
 Sebaea micrantha (Cham. & Schltdl.) Schinz, indigenous
 Sebaea micrantha (Cham. & Schltdl.) Schinz var. intermedia (Cham. & Schltdl.) Marais, endemic
 Sebaea micrantha (Cham. & Schltdl.) Schinz var. micrantha,   endemic
 Sebaea minutiflora Schinz, endemic
 Sebaea minutissima Hilliard & B.L.Burtt, indigenous
 Sebaea natalensis Schinz, indigenous
 Sebaea pentandra E.Mey. indigenous
 Sebaea pentandra E.Mey. var. burchellii (Gilg) Marais, indigenous
 Sebaea pentandra E.Mey. var. pentandra,   indigenous
 Sebaea pleurostigmatosa Hilliard & B.L.Burtt, endemic
 Sebaea procumbens A.W.Hill, indigenous
 Sebaea pusilla Eckl. ex Cham. accepted as Lagenias pusillus (Eckl. ex Cham.) E.Mey. endemic
 Sebaea radiata Hilliard & B.L.Burtt, endemic
 Sebaea ramosissima Gilg, endemic
 Sebaea rara Wolley-Dod, endemic
 Sebaea rehmannii Schinz, indigenous
 Sebaea repens Schinz, indigenous
 Sebaea scabra Schinz, endemic
 Sebaea schlechteri Schinz, endemic
 Sebaea sedoides Gilg, indigenous
 Sebaea sedoides Gilg var. confertiflora (Schinz) Marais, indigenous
 Sebaea sedoides Gilg var. schoenlandii (Schinz) Marais, indigenous
 Sebaea sedoides Gilg var. sedoides,   indigenous
 Sebaea spathulata (E.Mey.) Steud. indigenous
 Sebaea stricta (E.Mey.) Gilg, endemic
 Sebaea sulphurea Cham. & Schltdl. endemic
 Sebaea thodeana Gilg, indigenous
 Sebaea thomasii (S.Moore) Schinz, indigenous
 Sebaea zeyheri Schinz, indigenous
 Sebaea zeyheri Schinz subsp. acutiloba (Schinz) Marais, endemic
 Sebaea zeyheri Schinz subsp. cleistantha (R.A.Dyer) Marais, endemic
 Sebaea zeyheri Schinz subsp. zeyheri,   endemic

Swertia
Genus Swertia:
 Swertia welwitschii Engl. indigenous

Loganiaceae
Family: Loganiaceae,

Strychnos
Genus Strychnos:
 Strychnos cocculoides Baker, indigenous
 Strychnos decussata (Pappe) Gilg, indigenous
 Strychnos gerrardii N.E.Br. indigenous
 Strychnos henningsii Gilg, indigenous
 Strychnos madagascariensis Poir. indigenous
 Strychnos mitis S.Moore, indigenous
 Strychnos potatorum L.f. indigenous
 Strychnos pungens Soler. indigenous
 Strychnos spinosa Lam. indigenous
 Strychnos spinosa Lam. subsp. spinosa,   indigenous
 Strychnos usambarensis Gilg, indigenous

Rubiaceae

Family: Rubiaceae, 75 genera have been recorded. Not all are necessarily currently accepted.

 Genus Afrocanthium:
 Genus Agathisanthemum:
 Genus Alberta:
 Genus Ancylanthos:
 Genus Anthospermum:
 Genus Breonadia:
 Genus Burchellia:
 Genus Canthium:
 Genus Carpacoce:
 Genus Catunaregam:
 Genus Cephalanthus:
 Genus Coddia:
 Genus Coffea:
 Genus Conostomium:
 Genus Coprosma:
 Genus Coptosperma:
 Genus Cordylostigma:
 Genus Crocyllis:
 Genus Crossopteryx:
 Genus Diodia:
 Genus Diplospora:
 Genus Empogona:
 Genus Eriosemopsis:
 Genus Fadogia:
 Genus Gaillonia:
 Genus Galium:
 Genus Galopina:
 Genus Gardenia:
 Genus Geophila:
 Genus Guettarda:
 Genus Hedyotis:
 Genus Heinsia:
 Genus Hymenodictyon:
 Genus Hyperacanthus:
 Genus Hypobathrum:
 Genus Ixora:
 Genus Keetia:
 Genus Kohautia:
 Genus Kraussia:
 Genus Lagynias:
 Genus Leptactina:
 Genus Mitriostigma:
 Genus Nenax:
 Genus Oldenlandia:
 Genus Otiophora:
 Genus Oxyanthus:
 Genus Pachystigma:
 Genus Pavetta:
 Genus Pentanisia:
 Genus Pentas:
 Genus Pentodon:
 Genus Phylohydrax:
 Genus Plectronia:
 Genus Plectroniella:
 Genus Plocama:
 Genus Psychotria:
 Genus Psydrax:
 Genus Pygmaeothamnus:
 Genus Pyrostria:
 Genus Randia:
 Genus Richardia:
 Genus Rothmannia:
 Genus Rubia:
 Genus Rytigynia:
 Genus Sericanthe:
 Genus Sherardia:
 Genus Spermacoce:
 Genus Stylocoryne:
 Genus Tapiphyllum:
 Genus Tarenna:
 Genus Tricalysia:
 Genus Trichostachys:
 Genus Vangueria:

References

South African plant biodiversity lists
Gentianales